McMillan Woods is a Gettysburg Battlefield forested area used during the Battle of Gettysburg and for camps after the American Civil War, including a CCC camp and the subsequent WWII POW camp at Gettysburg.  The woods includes Rifle Pits and Earth Works from the battle

The cast iron site identification tablet for the woods was placed in 1920, and the woods is the site of a youth campground.

History

References

Forests of Pennsylvania
Gettysburg Battlefield